Alexander Dvoinykh (Russian: Александр Владимирович Двойных; born 19 January 1984) is a Russian politician serving as a senator from the Moscow City Duma since 30 September 2021.

Alexander Dvoinykh is under personal sanctions introduced by the European Union, the United Kingdom, the USA, Canada, Switzerland, Australia, Ukraine, New Zealand, for ratifying the decisions of the "Treaty of Friendship, Cooperation and Mutual Assistance between the Russian Federation and the Donetsk People's Republic and between the Russian Federation and the Luhansk People's Republic" and providing political and economic support for Russia's annexation of Ukrainian territories.

Biography

Alexander Dvoinykh was born on 19 January 1984 in Sergiyev Posad. In 2006, he graduated from the Moscow Polytechnic University. In 2016, he also received a degree from the Russian Presidential Academy of National Economy and Public Administration. From 2009 to 2011, he was the deputy of the Council of Deputies of the urban settlement of Sergiev Posad of the 2nd convocation. On 4 December 2011, he was elected deputy of the Moscow Oblast Duma from the Sergiyev Posad okrug. On 30 September 2021, he became the senator from the Moscow City Duma.

References

Living people
1984 births
United Russia politicians
21st-century Russian politicians
People from Sergiyev Posad
Members of the Federation Council of Russia (after 2000)